Rationalization may refer to:

 Rationalization (economics), an attempt to change an ad hoc workflow into one based on published rules; also, jargon for a reduction in staff
 Rationalisation (mathematics), the process of removing a square root or imaginary number from the denominator of a fraction
 Rationalization (psychology), a psychological defense mechanism in which perceived controversial behaviors are logically justified also known as "making excuses"
 Post-purchase rationalization, a tendency to retroactively ascribe positive attributes to an option one has selected
 Rationalization (sociology), the replacement of traditions, values, and emotions as motives for behavior in society with rational motives

See also
 Rational (disambiguation)
 Rationale (disambiguation)
 Rationalism (disambiguation)
 Rationality